The 2004 Formula Ford Zetec Cooper Tires Championship Series was the fourth the USF2000 Ford Zetec championship. Cape Motorsports driver Bobby Wilson took the title in a Van Diemen RF03. Jason Bowles won the rookie of the year title.

Race calendar and results

Final standings

References

Formula Ford Zetec
U.S. F2000 National Championship seasons